Visar Berisha (born 7 December 1986) is a Kosovan professional footballer who plays as a centre-back for Kosovo First League club Liria Prizren.

International career

Albania
Berisha was expected to be called up by the Albania national team after his good performances with Schaffhausen, but due to the rupture of the ligaments of his right knee, he lost the chance to be called up from Albania, but also to be transferred to Swiss club Grasshoppers.

Kosovo
On 22 January 2018, Berisha received a call-up from Kosovo for the friendly match against Azerbaijan. However, the match was cancelled and therefore he was unable to make his debut.

References

External links

1986 births
Living people
People from Suva Reka
Kosovan footballers
Kosovan expatriate footballers
Kosovan expatriate sportspeople in Switzerland
Association football central defenders
Football Superleague of Kosovo players
KF Liria players
FC Prishtina players
KF Ballkani players
KF Drenica players
Swiss Challenge League players
FC Winterthur players
FC Schaffhausen players